André Gegout (9 February 1904 – 10 February 1976) was a French speed skater. He competed in five events at the 1924 Winter Olympics.

References

1904 births
1976 deaths
French male speed skaters
Olympic speed skaters of France
Speed skaters at the 1924 Winter Olympics
Sportspeople from Vosges (department)